Ammocharis nerinoides is a plant species endemic to Namibia, known from the Gobabis and Etoshapan Districts. It occurs in desert regions in river beds occasionally flooded with seasonal rainfall. It is also cultivated elsewhere for its showy flowers.

Ammocharis nerinoides is a perennial herb forming egg-shaped bulbs up to 50 mm in diameter. It has 4-10 leaves, distichously arranged, narrow, up to 40 cm long, with very small teeth along the margins. Flowering stalk is flattened, reddish-green, up to 12 cm tall. Flowers are borne in an umbel of up to 7 pink flowers.

References

Amaryllidoideae
Endemic flora of Namibia
Taxa named by John Gilbert Baker